Nasirabad (also Romanized as Naşīrābād; also known as Naşīrābād-e Avval and Naşrābād) is a village in Rostaq Rural District, in the Central District of Neyriz County, Fars Province, Iran. At the 2006 census, its population was 390, in 97 families.

References 

Populated places in Neyriz County